Crocomela colorata is a moth of the subfamily Arctiinae. It was described by Francis Walker in 1865. It is found in Colombia and Peru.

Subspecies
Crocomela colorata colorata (Colombia)
Crocomela colorata splendida Bryk, 1953 (Peru)

References

Arctiinae
Moths described in 1865